This is a listing of the horses that finished in either first, second, or third place and the number of starters in the Humana Distaff Handicap, an American Grade 1 race for fillies and mares age four and up at seven furlongs on the dirt held at Churchill Downs in Louisville, Kentucky.

See also 

 List of graded stakes at Churchill Downs

References 

Lists of horse racing results
Churchill Downs
Louisville, Kentucky-related lists